SS Minnehaha was a 13,443-ton ocean liner built by Harland and Wolff and launched on 31 March 1900.

In her first year of operations, the Minnehaha collided with and sank a tug in New York Harbor on 18 September 1900. The tug suffered two fatalities.

On 18 April 1910, the liner grounded on rocks on Bryher in the Isles of Scilly while en route from New York City to Tilbury, near London; she remained stranded until 13 May when two tugs managed to pull her off the rocks. The cattle on board were saved by swimming them onto the island of Samson, Isles of Scilly where there was temporary pasture; there were no deaths.

The ship was being used to ferry munitions to Britain from the U.S. during the early years of World War I.  During a multi-state crime spree, German sympathizer Eric Muenter planted a timed bomb on the Minnehaha after bombing the U.S. Capitol and before shooting financier J. P. Morgan, Jr.  Days after his jail-cell suicide, Muenter's bomb exploded, setting off a fire, though the explosion did not reach the munitions and caused minimal damage to the ship itself.

On 7 September 1917, Minnehaha sank within four minutes with 43 fatalities, after being torpedoed by German U-boat U-48, off the Fastnet.  Her sister ships Minneapolis and Minnetonka were sunk while in use as troop transports during World War I.

See also

 Minnehaha – wrecked off Peninnis Head in the Isles of Scilly on 18 January 1874
 List of shipwrecks of the Isles of Scilly
 Atlantic Transport Line

References

External links
 SS Minnehaha, Irish Wrecks Online
 Minnehaha 1910, Scillonian History
 Antique Associates at West Townsend — S. S. Minnehaha, Oil On Canvas by Antonio Jacobson Circa 1903 (page from Archive.org)
 The Salvage of the Minnehaha (1910 description)

1900 ships
Ships built in Belfast
Merchant ships of the United States
Maritime incidents in 1900
Maritime incidents in 1910
Shipwrecks of the Isles of Scilly
Maritime incidents in 1917
World War I shipwrecks in the Atlantic Ocean
Ships sunk by German submarines in World War I
Shipwrecks of Ireland
Ships built by Harland and Wolff